The 53rd New Brunswick Legislative Assembly was created following a general election in 1995 and was dissolved on May 8, 1999.

Leadership

The speaker from its first meeting until July 21, 1997, was Danny Gay, Gay resigned the speakership to join the cabinet.  John McKay was elected to succeed Gay as speaker later in the session.

Premier Frank McKenna led the government from the beginning of the assembly until he resigned on October 12, 1997.  He was succeeded as Premier by Ray Frenette who served as interim leader of McKenna's Liberals until Camille Thériault was elected as permanent leader.  Thériault led the government as Premier from May 14, 1998

The opposition was led from the forming of the assembly until 1997 by Bernard Valcourt, then by Elvy Robichaud who served as parliamentary leader of the Progressive Conservatives until Bernard Lord, who succeeded Valcourt as PC leader in 1997, gained a seat in 1998.

Elizabeth Weir led the third party New Democrats for the life of the assembly.

Members

All were elected in the 33rd general election held on September 11, 1995, except for James Doyle and Peter Mesheau, elected in by-elections on November 17, 1997, and Shawn Graham, Brad Green and Bernard Lord elected in by-elections on October 19, 1998.  Albert Doucet was removed from the Liberal  cabinet on February 5, 1997 and then was removed from caucus in March of that year, sitting as an independent until January 30, 1998 when he was accepted back into the Liberal fold.

Members at dissolution

Bold denotes a member of the cabinet.
Italics denotes a party leader
† denotes the Speaker

Former members

Marilyn Trenholme Counsell, a Liberal, was first elected to the legislature in the 1987 election, she resigned in 1997 to accept an appointment as Lieutenant-Governor of New Brunswick.
Frank McKenna, a Liberal, was first elected to the legislature in the 1982 election, he resigned in 1997 in conjunction with his resignation as Premier.
Ray Frenette, a Liberal, was first elected to the legislature in the 1974 election, he resigned in 1998 following his resignation as Premier.
Alan Graham, a Liberal, was first elected to the legislature in the 1967 election, he resigned in 1998 after retiring from the cabinet.
Russell King, a Liberal, was first elected to the legislature in the 1987 election, he resigned in 1998 after retiring from the cabinet.

See also
1995 New Brunswick general election
Legislative Assembly of New Brunswick

References 
 Elections in New Brunswick 1984–2006, Elections New Brunswick (pdf)

Terms of the New Brunswick Legislature
1995 establishments in New Brunswick
1999 disestablishments in New Brunswick
20th century in New Brunswick